Tangled Tunes is a piece of light classical music by Albert Ketèlbey, first recorded in 1914, comprising 107 melodies with some repetitions.

 Rule, Britannia!
 Three Blind Mice
 Mistletoe Bough
 Ah Che la Morte (Trovatore)
 Flower Song (Faust)
 Three Fishers Went a Sailing
 Drinking
 Heart of Oak
 Charlie is My Darling
 The Minstrel Boy
 Gathering Nuts in May
 Dixie's Land
 Soldiers' Chorus (Trovatore)
 Grandfather's Clock
 Marseillaise
 British Grenadiers
 Home Sweet Home
 Bluebells of Scotland
 Intro. Act III Lohengrin
 Sailor's Hornpipe
 The Girl I Left Behind Me
 Garry Owen
 Poet and Peasant
 1812 Overture
 Tannhauser March
 1812 Overture
 Il Bacio
 Romeo and Juliet Waltz
 Prophete March
 Soldiers' Chorus (Faust)
 O Tender Moon (Faust)
 Silver Threads Among the Gold
 Killarney
 Mary of Argyle
 Robin Adair
 Wedding March (Mendelssohn)
 Anvil Chorus (Trovatore)
 Yankee Doodle
 Dixie's Land
 Maid of Athens
 Johnny Get Your Gun
 Raymond Overture
 Light Cavalry Overture
 The Keel Row
 For He's a Jolly Good Fellow
 The Harp That Once Thro' Tara's Halls
 Village Blacksmith
 Scenes That are Brightest (Maritana)
 Lend Me Your Aid
 Blue Danube
 Poet and Peasant
 Spring Song
 Little Brown Jug
 La Donna e Mobile (Rigoletto)
 Excelsior
 Lass of Richmond Hill
 Bay of Biscay
 Rule, Britannia!
 Vicar of Bray
 John Peel
 Last Rose of Summer
 Villikins and His Dinah
 Buy a Broom
 The Ash Grove
 Sally in Our Alley
 Alice, Where Art Thou?
 Sweet Genevieve
 Semiramide Overture
 Marche aux Flambeaux
 Marching Through Georgia
 Merry Wives of Windsor
 Stephanie Gavotte
 Kirmesse Scene (Faust)
 March (Damnation de Faust)
 Sword Chorus (Faust)
 1812 Overture
 Bohemian Girl Overture
 Der Freischütz Overture
 Tannhauser March
 Three Cheers for the Red White and Blue
 When Johnny Comes Marching Home
 William Tell Overture
 Good King Wenceslas
 Tannhauser March
 Il Balen (Trovatore)
 Dio Possente (Faust)
 Athalie March
 How Can I Leave Thee
 Come, Birdie Come
 Tarara-Boom-De-Ay
 Tancredi Overture
 Oh Dear What Can the Matter Be
 Rocked in the Cradle of the Deep
 The Bogie Man
 Pop Goes the Weasel
 Amoretten Tanz
 Valse des Fleurs (Casse-noisette)
 Waltz in A flat (Chopin)
 Nocturne (Chopin)
 Fragment from Faust
 Faust Waltz
 Flying Dutchman Overture
 Auld Lang Syne
 Old English Gentleman
 Zampa
 God Save the King
 'Alf a pint of mild and bitter (added post publication)

References

 [recording] Tangled Tunes, arr. Albert W. Ketelbey. Columbia 2423-4, matrix 28910, 28946, 28965, 28966, issued in London in July 1914.
 [piano sheet music] Tangled Tunes: a pot-pourri of 106 favourite melodies humourously entangled / by Albert W. Ketelbey.  London: Ascherberg, Hopwood & Crew, 1915.

Compositions by Albert Ketèlbey